Lakamanahalli is a suburb in Dharwad city, Dharwad district of Karnataka, India. It severs as a industrial area for small scale industries which are involved in clothing, silk, textile and rubber moulding. It is located about 6km from the centre of the city. Lakkamanahalli is connected to HDBRTS corridor and recently to Samparka BRTS bus service in December 2022.

References

Neighborhoods in Dharwad